Testudinaria elegans is a species of spiders in the family Araneidae. It is found from Panama to Peru.

References

 Testudinaria elegans at the World Spider Catalog

Araneidae
Spiders described in 1879
Spiders of South America
Spiders of Central America
Fauna of Peru